Associação Esportiva Recreativa Engenheiro Beltrão, usually known simply as Engenheiro Beltrão, is a Brazilian football team from the city of Engenheiro Beltrão, Paraná state, founded on January 1, 2003.

References 

Association football clubs established in 2003
Football clubs in Paraná (state)
2003 establishments in Brazil